Qoliabad may refer to:
 Qoliabad, Golestan
 Qoliabad, Hamadan
 Qoliabad, Kermanshah
 Qoliabad, Kurdistan